Swami Ramananda Tirtha Institute of Science & Technology (SRTIST) is the first engineering college established in the district of Nalgonda. It is located in Ramananda Nagar, Sagar road, Nalgonda, India. It is 13 km from Nalgonda railway station. The college is affiliated to Jawaharlal Nehru Technological University, Hyderabad.

Information 
The college was established in 1996 and functions in its own building with a campus area of 30 acres and a built up area of 8500 square metres. Students who have passed the qualifying examination with English as medium of instruction. Apart from hostel facilities exclusively for about 100 girls, the institution has drawing halls, laboratories, workshops, library, video library, digital library, internet centre for students, and canteen.

Campus 
There are labs and computer centers within all the blocks of the college. There is a library and information center, sports and indoor and outdoor games.

Admissions 
The college admits undergraduate students through the statewide EAMCET exam conducted every year. It offers Bachelor of Technology (BTech) degrees in:
Civil Engineering (120)
Electrical & Electronics Engineering (120)
Mechanical Engineering (120)
Electronics & Communication Engineering (120)
Computer Science & Engineering (120)
Information Technology (60)
Master of Computer Applications (60)
Master of Business Administration (60)
Master of Technology(CAD/CAM) – (18)
Master of Technology(Embedded Systems)- (18)
Master of Technology(VLSI SD) – (18)
Master of Technology(CSE) – (18)

Intake
Students are offered seats in undergraduate courses every year through EAMCET. Through GATE, MTech and ME courses are offered. Through ICET, management courses are available to students.

Extracurricular 
Every year, as part of Spoorthi, the Inter-Department Fest, an inter-department sports competition is held. Sports in the Fest are basketball, cricket, badminton, volleyball, and field events.

Gallery

References

External links 

Official Website 
SRTIST on Google Map

All India Council for Technical Education
Engineering colleges in Telangana
1996 establishments in Andhra Pradesh
Educational institutions established in 1996